The Tamil calendar is a sidereal solar calendar used by the Tamil people of the Indian subcontinent. It is also used in Puducherry, and by the Tamil population in Sri Lanka, Malaysia, Singapore, and Mauritius.  

It is used in contemporary times for cultural, religious and agricultural events, with the Gregorian calendar largely used for official purposes both within and outside India. The Tamil calendar is based on the classical Hindu solar calendar also used in Assam, West Bengal, Kerala, Manipur, Nepal, Odisha, Rajasthan, and Punjab.

Description 
The calendar follows a 60-year cycle that is also very ancient and is observed by most traditional calendars of India and China. This is related to 5 12-year revolutions of Jupiter around the Sun and one that adds up to 60 years and the orbit of Nakshatras (stars) as described in the Surya Siddhanta.

In the Gregorian year , the Tamil year starts on 14 April , Kaliyuga . The Vikrama and Shalivahana (Saka) eras are also used.
 
There are several references in early Tamil literature to the new year. Nakkeerar, Sangam period author of the Neṭunalvāṭai, wrote in the third century CE that the Sun travels each year from Mesha/Chittirai in mid-April through 11 successive signs of the zodiac. Kūdalūr Kiḻar in the third century CE refers to Mesha Rāsi/Chittirai i.e. mid-April as the commencement of the year in the Puṟanāṉūṟu. The Tolkappiyam is the oldest surviving Tamil grammar text that divides the year into six seasons where Chihthirrai i.e. mid-April marks the start of the Ilavenil season or Summer. The 5th century Silappadhigaaram mentions the 12 rāsigal or zodiac signs that correspond to the Tamil months starting with Mesha/Chittirai in mid-April. The Manimekalai alludes to this very same Hindu solar calendar as we know it today Adiyarkunalaar, an early medieval commentator or Urai-asiriyar mentions the twelve months of the Tamil calendar with particular reference to Chittirai i.e. mid-April. There were subsequent inscriptional references in Pagan, Burma dated to the 11th century CE and in Sukhothai, Thailand dated to the 14th century CE to South Indian, often Vaishnavite, courtiers who were tasked with defining the traditional calendar that began in mid-April.

The Tamil New Year follows the nirayanam vernal equinox and generally falls on 14 April of the Gregorian year. 14 April marks the first day of the traditional Tamil calendar and is a public holiday in the state of Tamil Nadu, Sri Lanka and Mauritius. Tropical vernal equinox fall around 22 March, and by adding 23 degrees of trepidation (oscillation) to it, we get the Hindu sidereal or Nirayana Mesha Sankranti (Sun's transition into nirayana Aries). Hence, the Tamil calendar begins on the same date in April which is observed by most traditional calendars of the rest of India – Assam, Bengal, Kerala, Odisha, Manipur, Punjab etc. This also coincides with the traditional new year in Burma, Cambodia, Laos, Sri Lanka, Bangladesh, Nepal, and Thailand.

Week
The days of week (Kiḻamai) in the Tamil Calendar relate to the celestial bodies in the solar system: Sun, Moon, Mars, Mercury, Jupiter, Venus, and Saturn, in that order. The week starts with Sunday.

Months
The number of days in a month varies between 29 and 33. These are the months of the Tamil Calendar.

The Sanskrit month starts a few weeks ahead of the Tamil month, since the Tamil calendar is a solar calendar, while the Sanskrit calendar is a lunisolar calendar.

Seasons

The Tamil year, in keeping with the old Indic calendar, is divided into six seasons, each of which lasts two months:

Sixty-year cycle

The 60-year cycle is common to both North and South Indian traditional calendars, with the same name and sequence of years. Its earliest reference is to be found in Surya Siddhanta, which Varahamihirar (550 CE) believed to be the most accurate of the then current theories of astronomy. However, in the Surya Siddhantic list, the first year was Vijaya and not Prabhava as currently used. There are some parallels in this sexagenary cycle with the Chinese calendar. The Surya Siddhanta and other Indian classical texts on astronomy had some influence on the Chinese calendar although it merits attention that the sexagenary cycle in China is itself very old.

After the completion of sixty years, the calendar starts a new with the first year. This corresponds to the Hindu "century." The Vakya or Tirukannitha Panchangam (the traditional Tamil almanac) outlines this sequence. It is related to the position of the planets in the sky with respect to earth. It means that the two major planets Sani/Saturn (which takes 30 years to complete one cycle round the sun) and the Viyaḻan/Jupiter (which takes 12 years to complete one cycle round the Sun) comes to the same position after 60 years.

The following list presents the current 60-year cycle of the Tamil calendar:

Celebrations
The months of the Tamil Calendar have great significance and are deeply rooted in the faith of Tamil Hindus. Some months are considered very auspicious, while a few are considered inauspicious as well. Tamil months start and end based on the Sun's shift from one Rāsi to the other, but the names of the months are based on the star on the start of the pournami in that month. The name of the month is sometimes the name of the star itself. (e.g. Chittirai is always the star on the pournami of the Chittirai month).

Some of the celebrations for each month are listed below. Dates in parentheses are not exact and usually vary by a day or two. Underneath (or beside) the months of the Hindu calendar are their Gregorian counterparts.

Significance
The Hindus developed a system of calendrics that encapsulates vast periods of time. For computing the age of the earth and various geological and other epochs, as well as the age of mankind, they still employ a Tamil calendar derived from ancient astronomical data, known as the Tirukkanida Panchanga
The 10th Tamil month, called Tai, falls in mid-January each year. It is celebrated with much enthusiasm within the Tamil Community all over the world. Tai is marked by gifts of new clothing for family members and prayers to God for prosperity in the coming year. Tai and the fifth month Āvaṇi are considered very auspicious for marriage and most marriages occur during these months.
The fourth month Ādi is a busy month for most people including priests as there will be major temple festivities throughout the month, so most weddings do not often fall in this month. Ādi is the month of preparation for the next crop cycle by farmers. Therefore, farming communities avoid major events like weddings in this month. Those members of the Tamil community who don't actively contribute/participate in farming take advantage by having important functions like wedding in this month. For example, the business community prefers this month for weddings. Ādi is usually the worst month for business, although when businesses recently initiated Ādi discounts, this situation has changed significantly. Each Friday of this month is set aside for prayer and worship.
Ādi is portrayed as an inauspicious month for union of newlyweds because conceiving in this month might often result in child delivery around April–May, the hottest months in Tamil Nadu (Agni natchathiram – ['pineḻu'] the last 7 days of Chithirai and ['muneḻu'] the first 7 days of Vaigasi). 'Ādi' is also the windiest month in Tamil Nadu, and hence the phrase 'Ādi kaatru ammiyai nagatrum' (literally, 'the strong winds in the month of Ādi can even move a stone grinder')
Puratāsi is when most of the non-vegetarian Tamil people fast from meat for a month. Each Saturday of this month is set apart to venerate the planet Saturn.
Deepavali, is celebrated on the new moon day, in the seventh month Aipasi. The month of Aipasi is usually characterised by the North-East Monsoon in Tamil Nadu, which has given birth to a phrase, Aipasi adai maḻai meaning the "Non-stop downpour".
Margaḻi falls in winter in Tamil Nadu, and is an auspicious month. The month is considered sacred. During the holy month of Margaḻi, houses are decorated with colorful and elaborate kolams. These are drawn on the threshold to welcome guests and divine beings to bless their houses with prosperity and happiness. The Shaivite fast of Thiru-vembaavai and the Vaishnava fast of Thiru-paavai are also observed in this month.
The total number of days in a Tamil Calendar is an average 365 days. The Vakiya Panchangam is employed for both sacred and civil calculations. The Trikanitha Panchangam is employed for astrological calculations.

Festivals
The Tamil Calendar is important in the life of Tamil-speaking people and most festivals of Tamil Nadu are based on it. Some festivals include: 
 Tamil New Year (also called Puthandu) 
 Tai Pongal
 Deepavali,
 Vinayagar chathurthi 
 Panguni Uthiram
 Thirukaarthigai
 Aadiperukku
 Navaratri

See also
 Chandravakyas
 Malayalam calendar
 Pambu Panchangam
 Puthandu
 Samvatsara
 Sexagenary cycle

References

External links
  @ Tamil Calendar for all past and future years (தமிழ் நாள்காட்டி)
 Tamil Calendar with Daily Panchangam
 Tamil Calendar for each year

Hindu calendar
Solar calendars
Tamil culture
Time in India